Joonas Sarelius (born 2 July 1979 in Finland) is a football striker

References

1979 births
Living people
Association football forwards
Finnish footballers
FC Espoo players
Footballers from Espoo